Periodic elections for the Tasmanian Legislative Council were held on 5 May 2018. The two seats up for elections were Hobart and Prosser. Hobart was previously contested in 2012. Prosser was a new division created in the 2017 redistribution, and was vacant pending this election.

Hobart

The seat of Hobart, based in the Tasmanian capital of Hobart, has been held by independent member Rob Valentine since 2012.

Results

Prosser

The east coast seat of Prosser was created in the redistribution of electoral boundaries which came into effect on 5 August 2017. No member was assigned to the seat at its creation, instead the members for the abolished divisions of Apsley (Tania Rattray) and Western Tiers (Greg Hall) were both allocated to the new McIntyre until the expiry of Hall's term at this election.

Results

References

External links
Tasmanian Electoral Commission website
Psephology commentary by Dr Kevin Bonham

2018 elections in Australia
2010s in Tasmania
Elections in Tasmania
May 2018 events in Australia
Tasmanian Legislative Council